Manuel Antonio Hermoso Rojas (San Cristóbal de La Laguna, 24 June 1935) is a Canarian politician.  He ran for mayor of  Santa Cruz de Tenerife from 1979 until 1991 and the fourth president of the Canary Islands Autonomous Region between 1993 and 1999.  He represents the Canarian Coalition party and was the first politician ever to bring his party and himself into power in 1993 he later succeeded after the elections by another Canarian Coalition politician Román Rodríguez Rodríguez in 1999.

References

1935 births
Living people
Presidents of the Canary Islands
Members of the 3rd Parliament of the Canary Islands
Canarian Coalition politicians
People from San Cristóbal de La Laguna
Members of the 4th Parliament of the Canary Islands